Dudko (Cyrillic: Дудко) is a gender-neutral Slavic surname. Notable people with the surname include:

 Lucy Dudko (born 1958), Russian-Australian woman convicted of hijacking a helicopter in 1999
 Mikhail Dudko (1902–1981), Russian ballet dancer

Slavic-language surnames